This is a list of the NCAA indoor champions in the 200 meters.  The event was first held in 1988.

Champions
Key
y=yards
w=wind aided
A=Altitude assisted

200 Meters

References

GBR Athletics

External links
NCAA Division I men's indoor track and field

NCAA Men's Division I Indoor Track and Field Championships
Indoor track, men